Anbastaq (also Romanized as Anbāstaq; also known as Amasti, Anbastīq, and Anbatīq) is a village in Peyghan Chayi Rural District, in the Central District of Kaleybar County, East Azerbaijan Province, Iran. At the 2006 census, its population was 230, in 46 families.

References 

Populated places in Kaleybar County